The 2016 Cincinnati Bengals season was the franchise's 47th season in the National Football League, the 49th overall and the fourteenth under head coach Marvin Lewis. The Bengals regressed from their 12–4 record from 2015, and missed the playoffs for the first time since 2010, finishing 6–9–1, and finishing in 3rd place in their division. This season would see the Bengals play in London for the first time ever, where they tied the Washington Redskins 27–27.

Offseason

Organizational changes 
On January 12, 2016, defensive backs coach Vance Joseph was hired as the new defensive coordinator of the Miami Dolphins. On the same day, linebackers coach Matt Burke also was hired as the new linebackers coach of the Miami Dolphins. On January 13, offensive coordinator Hue Jackson was hired as the new head coach of the Cleveland Browns. On January 15, quarterbacks coach Ken Zampese was promoted to offensive coordinator. On the same day, former New Orleans Saints head coach Jim Haslett was hired as the new linebackers coach. On January 18, the Bengals hired former Miami Dolphins assistant coaches Bill Lazor as the new quarterbacks coach, and Kevin Coyle as the new defensive backs coach, as well as hiring Washington Redskins assistant coach Jacob Burney as the new defensive line coach. On January 19, defensive line coach Jay Hayes was hired to be the new defensive line coach of the Tampa Bay Buccaneers.

Contract extensions 
On March 4, the Bengals signed wide receiver Brandon Tate to a one-year extension through 2017 worth $1,024,000. On March 7, the Bengals signed center T. J. Johnson to a one-year extension through 2017 worth $600,000. On May 17, the Bengals signed safety Shawn Williams to a four-year extension through 2020 worth $19.5 million. On June 8, the Bengals signed halfback Giovani Benard to a three-year extension through 2019 worth $15.5 million. On August 2, the Bengals signed tight end Ryan Hewitt to a three-year extension through 2019 worth $7.5 million.

Roster changes

Acquisitions

Pre-Draft 
The first transactions of the year occurred shortly after the conclusion of the 2015 regular season on January 8, when the Bengals signed kicker Zach Hocker, defensive end Dezmond Johnson and safety Floyd Raven to Reserve/Future contracts. On January 11, the Bengals signed wide receiver Michael Bennett and Jake Kumerow, offensive lineman Trey Hopkins, linebacker Jeff Luc and Jayson DiManche, and tight end Matt Lengel to reserve/future contracts. Additionally, the Bengals signed running back Bronson Hill to a reserve/future contract on February 2, and tight end John Peters on February 3. On February 8, the Bengals signed Baltimore Ravens offensive lineman Darryl Baldwin and New York Giants cornerback Chykie Brown.

On March 17, the Bengals signed Oakland Raiders safety Taylor Mays. On March 29, 2016, they signed Cleveland Browns linebacker Karlos Dansby. On March 30, the Bengals signed New England Patriots wide receiver Brandon LaFell.

Post-Draft 
On May 8, the Bengals signed four undrafted free agents: kicker Jonathan Brown (Louisville), linebacker Gionni Paul (Utah), offensive lineman Trip Thurman (Florida), and cornerback Corey Tindal (Marshall). On May 11, the Bengals signed former Louisville offensive lineman Aaron Epps (UDFA). On May 16, the Bengals signed former Buffalo quarterback Joe Licata (UDFA). On May 26, the Bengals signed fullback Andrew Bonnet. On July 26, the Bengals signed former Calgary wide receiver Rashaun Simonise (UDFA). On July 27, the Bengals signed former Nebraska defensive end Jack Gangwish (UDFA). On July 28, the Bengals signed safety Jimmy Wilson.

Departures 
Of the Bengals' unrestricted free agents, wide receiver Mohamed Sanu signed a 5-year $40 million contract with the Atlanta Falcons on March 11. On the same day, wide receiver Marvin Jones signed a 5-year $40 million contract with the Detroit Lions. On April 6, safety Reggie Nelson signed a 2-year $12 million contract with the Oakland Raiders. On August 4, cornerback Leon Hall signed a one-year $2 million deal with the New York Giants.

On April 26, the Bengals released linebacker A.J. Hawk. On May 11, offensive lineman Darryl Baldwin was released. On May 16, undrafted free agent quarterback Matt Johnson was released. On July 20, undrafted free agent cornerback Corey Tindal was released. On July 26, defensive end Dezmond Johnson and undrafted free agent running back DyShawn Mobley were released.

2016 NFL Draft

Pre-draft 
Prior to the draft, the Bengals held visits for 40 players; 15 had private visits, 5 players visited during the NFL Scouting Combine, 1 met during the Senior Bowl, and 2 at the East–West Shrine Game, 11 had private workouts, while 2 had local visits.

Draft

Undrafted free agents 
After the draft, the Bengals signed the following undrafted free agents.

Schedule

Preseason

Regular season

Note: Intra-division opponents are in bold text.

Game summaries

Week 1: at New York Jets

In a hard fought affair, Andy Dalton threw for 366 yards and a touchdown, but was sacked a career-high seven times. A. J. Green finished the game with 12 receptions for 180 yards plus a touchdown. The Bengals trailed by one with just over three minutes left in the game, but Dalton completed all four of his passes for 33 yards to set up Mike Nugent's go-ahead field goal with 54 seconds remaining. Three plays into the ensuing Jets' drive, Bengals' defensive back Josh Shaw recorded his first interception, picking off Ryan Fitzpatrick on a 3rd and 10 to seal a third straight season-opening victory for Cincinnati as they started 1–0. They also snapped a 9-game road losing streak to the Jets.

Week 2: at Pittsburgh Steelers

On a rain-soaked Heinz Field, the Bengals' offense struggled to get much going against the Steelers. All three of the Bengals' red zone trips resulted in Mike Nugent field goals, while Pittsburgh quarterback Ben Roethlisberger threw three touchdowns. With just under seven minutes left in the game, Roethlisberger tossed a four-yard touchdown to running back DeAngelo Williams that gave Pittsburgh a 24–9 lead. The Bengals responded, however, as Andy Dalton drove Cincinnati to a quick score, finding Giovani Bernard on a 25-yard touchdown to make it 24–16. Trying to tie the game, Cincinnati drove to the Steelers' 39-yard line with two minutes left in the game, but rookie receiver Tyler Boyd's fumble sealed a Bengals loss. It appeared Boyd 's knee was down before he lost control of the ball on a hit by James Harrison, but upon review, the call stood and the Bengals dropped to 1–1. Dalton threw for 366 yards for the second straight week, giving him the NFL lead in passing yards (732) through two weeks.

Week 3: vs. Denver Broncos

Hosting the defending Super Bowl champion Broncos, Andy Dalton's 300-yard streak was stopped, throwing for just 206 yards. It was also his second straight game in which he did not throw a touchdown pass. With the loss, the Bengals dropped to 1–2 and third place in the AFC North.

Week 4: vs. Miami Dolphins

The Bengals wore white and black Color Rush uniforms for this game. With the win, the Bengals improved to 2–2.

Week 5: at Dallas Cowboys

With the loss, the Bengals dropped to 2–3.

Week 6: at New England Patriots

Newly acquired Brandon LaFell returned to New England for the first time after leaving the Patriots in the offseason. With the loss, the Bengals dropped to 2–4.

Week 7: vs. Cleveland Browns

With their fourth straight win over the Browns, the Bengals improved to 3–4. With the Ravens' loss to the Jets, the Bengals moved into a tie for second in the AFC North.

Week 8: vs. Washington Redskins
NFL International Series

The Bengals hosted the Washington Redskins in London between a shootout between Kirk Cousins and Andy Dalton. Unfortunately, the Bengals could not score in overtime nor the Redskins and thus allowed a tie for the third time in 10 years and first tie since tying with the Carolina Panthers 37–37 in 2014, leaving their record at 3–4–1.

Week 10: at New York Giants
With the loss, the Bengals fell to 3–5–1. They also fell to 0–4 all time against the Giants on the road.

Week 11: vs. Buffalo Bills

Not only did the Bengals lose 16–12 and drop to 3–6–1, but lost star wide receiver A. J. Green to a pulled hamstring in the first quarter.

Week 12: at Baltimore Ravens
 With the loss, the Bengals fell to 3–7–1. Also, their 5-game winning streak against the Ravens was snapped.

Week 13: vs. Philadelphia Eagles
With the win, the Bengals improved to 4–7–1. They also improved to 4–0–1 all time at home against Philadelphia.

Week 14: at Cleveland Browns
 With the win, the Bengals improved to 5–7–1, and are still in playoff contention.

Week 15: vs. Pittsburgh Steelers

With their fourth straight loss to the Steelers, the Bengals fell to 5–8–1. The game was just a few moments away from wrapping up when the Baltimore Ravens beat the Philadelphia Eagles 28-27. As a result, the Cincinnati Bengals were eliminated from playoff contention no matter the outcome. The Bengals were condemned to their first losing season since 2010.

Week 16: at Houston Texans

As time expired, Randy Bullock missed the game-winning field goal sending the Bengals to 5–9–1.  Dalton also set a new career-high of losses in a single season.

Week 17: vs. Baltimore Ravens

With the win, the Bengals ended their season at 6–9–1.

Standings

Division

Conference

Staff

Final roster

References

External links
 

Cincinnati
Cincinnati Bengals seasons
Cincinnati Bengals